Marc Rabémila (27 April 1938 – 16 May 2008) was a Malagasy athlete. He competed in the men's triple jump at the 1964 Summer Olympics.

References

1938 births
2008 deaths
Athletes (track and field) at the 1964 Summer Olympics
Malagasy male triple jumpers
Olympic athletes of Madagascar
Place of birth missing
French male triple jumpers
Mediterranean Games medalists in athletics
Mediterranean Games silver medalists for France
Athletes (track and field) at the 1959 Mediterranean Games